The Italian Environmental Film Festival (in Italian: Festival CinemAmbiente or Festival internazionale di cinema e cultura ambientale) is an important Italian film festival founded in 1998 and taking place every year in Turin, Italy.
It is a member of the Environmental Film Festival Network, which is an association of international festivals in environmental issues.

Award winners 
2001: Children, Kossoco 2000 by Ferenc Moldovànyi (Hungary, 2001, 30')
2002: God's Children by Hiroshi Shinomiya (Japan, 2001, 105')
2003: Dans Grozny dans by Jos de Putter (Netherlands, 2002, 75')
2004: Carpatia by Andrzej Klamt and Ulrich Rydzewsky, (Germany, Austria, 2004, 127')
2005: Shape of the Moon by Leonard Retel Helmrich, (Netherlands, 2004, 92')
2006: The Real Dirt on Farmer John by Taggart Siegel (USA, 2005, 83')
2007: The Planet by Michael Stenberg, Linus Torell and Johan Söderberg, (Sweden, Norway, 2006, 84')
2008: The Nuclear Come Back by Justin Pemberton, (New Zealand, 2007, 75')
2009: Old partner by Lee Chung-ryoul, (South Korea, 2008, 75')
2010: Life for sale by Yorgos Avgeropoulos (Greece, 2010, 61'), 2010)
2011: There once was an island by Briar March (New Zealand, USA, 2010, 80')
2012: The Big Fix by Josh Tickell and Rebecca Tickell (USA, France, 2011, 88’)
 2013: Der Letze Fang by Markus C. M. Schmidt, (Germany, 2012, 85’)
 2014: Virunga by Orlando von Einsiedel, (Great Britain, 2014, 97)
 2015: Bikes vs Cars by Fredrik Gertten, (Sweden, 2015, 91’)
 2016: When Two Worlds Collide by Heidi Brandenburg and Mathew Orzel, (Peru, 2016, 100')
 2017: Plastic China by Jiuliang Wang (China, 2016, 82’)
 2018: Genesis 2.0 by Christian Frei, Maxim Arbugaev (Swiss, 2018, 103’)
 2019: The Burning Field by Justin Weinrich, (USA, 2019, 72’)
 2020: special online edition without prizewinners due to the COVID 19 pandemic 
 2021: Marcher sur l'eau by Aissa Maiga, (France, Belgium, 2021, 89')

References

External links

Culture in Turin
1998 establishments in Italy
Recurring events established in 1998
Environmental film festivals in Italy
Events in Turin